Monegaw Township is an inactive township in St. Clair County, in the U.S. state of Missouri.

Monegaw Township was erected in 1841, taking its name from a spring of the same name within its borders.  The spring has the name of Monegaw, an Osage tribal leader.

References

Townships in Missouri
Townships in St. Clair County, Missouri